Surkhab TV is a Punjabi language news channel,  owned by the Surkhab Media Opc Pvt. Ltd.

History 
The channel launched in 2018. The channel deliver news in Punjabi Language on all online digital Platform.

References

External links
 
 

Television in India
Television in Pakistan